Lulekani (nicknamed Lukcity) is a township 13 km outside Phalaborwa in Mopani District Municipality in the Limpopo province of South Africa. Lulekani is close to Kruger National Park Border and has two main shopping centers, mainly Lulekani Spar and Lulekani Shoprite. It is also a home of a popular restaurant in Phalaborwa, called Mthunzi Bar and Restaurant. There is a Lulekani stadium just few hundred meters from Lulekani Shoprite.

The neighboring townships of Lulekani is Namakgale, Majeje (Benfarm), Makhushwane and Mashishimale on the R71 road to Gravelotte. During the Census of 2011, the population of Lulekani and its neighbouring township Humulani counted 40 225.

References

Populated places in the Ba-Phalaborwa Local Municipality
1979 establishments in South Africa